Eupithecia karli is a moth in the family Geometridae. It is found in Kashmir.

The wingspan is about 19–20 mm. The fore- and hindwings are grey or pale grey.

References

Moths described in 2008
karli
Moths of Asia